The Manhattan Jaspers soccer program represents Manhattan College in all NCAA Division I men's college soccer competitions. Founded in 1967, the Jaspers compete in the Metro Atlantic Athletic Conference. The Jaspers are coached by Jorden Scott, who has coached the program since 2012. The Jaspers plays their home matches at Gaelic Park, near the Manhattan campus. The head coach is in his 7th season.

Individual honors

Conference honors

Team honors 
 Career Goals Leader: Robert Schimpf, 41 (1969–71)
 Career Assists Leader: Bo Kucyna, 34 (1977–80)
 Career Saves Leader: Tom Umstatter, 377 (1974–75)
 Career Shutouts Leader: Andy Hlushko, 12 (1980–82)

References

External links
 

 
1967 establishments in New York City
Sports in the Bronx